Joseph Andrew "Drew" Casper is a Professor of Critical Studies who previously worked at the School of Cinematic Arts as part of the University of Southern California and considered to be an authority on American film from World War II to the present. While a Ph.D. student at USC, Dr. Casper's mentor, Irwin Blacker, died suddenly and the Cinema department offered Dr. Casper a position. Casper rose to become the third-highest-paid person at USC. In the fall of 1997, the estate of Alfred Hitchcock and USC made Dr. Casper the first Alma and Alfred Hitchcock Professor for the Study of American Film.  He retired from his role at USC in December 2019 after 47 years. Casper provides a steady stream of DVD commentaries and expertise on films.  He is the author of books about Vincente Minnelli, Stanley Donen, a book on Postwar Hollywood 1946–1962., and a volume called Hollywood Film, 1963-1976: Years of Revolution and Reaction.

DVDs provided commentary for 
Act of Violence
Advise and Consent
The Amazing Dr. Clitterhouse, with film historian Richard B. Jewell
The Asphalt Jungle, with actor James Whitmore
Cabin in the Sky, with Evangela Anderson and Eva Anderson (wife and daughter of actor Eddie "Rochester" Anderson), dancer Fayard Nicholas, and black cultural scholar Todd Boyd, plus interview excerpts of actress Lena Horne
The Dolly Sisters
The Gang's All Here
The Hustler
Lady Killer
Lifeboat
Lust for Life
My Blue Heaven
Notorious
Possessed
The Prodigal
This Is the Army, with actress Joan Leslie
To Catch a Thief
12 Angry Men
White Heat
The Young Philadelphians, with director Vincent Sherman

References

American film historians
American male non-fiction writers
Film theorists
Living people
USC School of Cinematic Arts alumni
USC School of Cinematic Arts faculty
Year of birth missing (living people)
Historians from California